Lyubomir Neikov (born 7 February 1972, in Cherven Bryag) is a Bulgarian comedian and actor. He is known for his work on television and in theatre. He graduated from the Technical School of electrical engineering and later he graduated from NATFIZ in 1998, specializing in Doll Acting. In 1998 he started working on Slavi's Show, where he was part of "The Actor Trio" together with Krasi Radkov and Viktor Kalev. He portrayed many different characters on the show, including The MC Pharaoh and Bate Boiko. In 2006 he quit the show and the trio disintegrated. In 2007 he started his own show named "Komitsite" (Bulgarian:"Комиците") ("The Comedians" - in English) with the famous Bulgarian actors Hristo Garbov, Chrastio Lafazanov and Ruslan Maynov. This show is in competition with Slavi's Show - the same show where Neykov worked before.

Neikov played the role of Omar Sharif in the 2008 political satire War, Inc., starring John Cusack, Marisa Tomei, Hilary Duff, Ben Kingsley and Dan Aykroyd.

He is married since 1998.

Filmography

External links

Bulgarian male film actors
Bulgarian male stage actors
Bulgarian male television actors
1972 births
Living people
People from Cherven Bryag
20th-century Bulgarian male actors
21st-century Bulgarian male actors